Pimelea calcicola is a species of flowering plant in the family Thymelaeaceae and is endemic to part of the west coast of Western Australia. It is an erect to spreading shrub with elliptic leaves arranged in opposite pairs, and head-like racemes of pale to deep pink, tube-shaped flowers surrounded by leaf-like involucral bracts.

Description
Flowering occurs from September to November.

Taxonomy
Pimelea calcicola was first formally described in 1984 by Barbara Lynette Rye in the journal Nuytsia from specimens collected in Carine in 1983. The specific epithet (calcicola) means "limestone inhabitant".

Distribution and habitat
This pimelea grows in coastal sand with limestone outcrops from the Yanchep National Park to the Yalgorup National Park in the Swan Coastal Plain bioregion of western Western Australia.

Conservation status
Pimelea calcicola is listed as "Priority Three" by the Government of Western Australia Department of Biodiversity, Conservation and Attractions, meaning that it is poorly known and known from only a few locations but is not under imminent threat.

References

calcicola
Rosids of Western Australia
Malvales of Australia
Taxa named by Barbara Lynette Rye
Plants described in 1984